The Somali State Resistance is an active resistance group in the Somali Region of Ethiopia that joined the United Front of Ethiopian Federalist and Confederalist Forces in 2021 during the Tigray War. The Somali State Resistance emerged as a prominent entity in 2021 under the leadership of Mahamud Ugas Muhumed, who aligned the group with the Tigray People's Liberation Front (TPLF) and eight other fronts during the ongoing Tigray War. The Somali State Resistance has stated their willingness to use both force and negotiation to attain their goals. The group issued a statement to the people of the Somali Region on 3 December 2021.

History 
In 2021, the group known as the Somali State Resistance, which has unknown origins, joined the United Front of Ethiopian Federalist and Confederalist Forces (UFEFCF) against the Ethiopian government during the ongoing Tigray War and Ethiopian civil conflict.

References 

Ethiopian civil conflict (2018–present)
Ethnic political parties in Ethiopia
Guerrilla organizations
National liberation movements in Africa
Political parties in Ethiopia
Rebel groups in Ethiopia